Silvio Rodić (born 25 July 1987) is a Croatian professional footballer who plays as a goalkeeper for NRFL Premier club Birkenhead United. Besides Croatia, he has played in Poland and New Zealand.

Career
A native of Donji Miholjac, Rodić joined NK Slaven Belupo in Koprivnica in 2002, aged 15. In his last under-19 season, he was loaned to Slaven's feeder club, NK Koprivnica in Croatia's second-tier. He would go onto establishing himself as the club's first choice goalkeeper there during his first two seasons of first-team football.

Upon his return to Slaven, he was initially the understudy to Vanja Iveša, however, by 2008/09, he would win the starting role, eventually making 150 league appearances for the club in Croatia's top-flight, the Prva HNL.

In early 2014, Rodić was loaned to Polish top-flight club, Zagłębie Lubin. His performances drew the attention of other league sides, and he was signed that summer by fellow Ektraklasa club, Górnik Łęczna.

In 2016, Rodić and his family immigrated to New Zealand. He signed for Eastern Suburbs in New Zealand's top tier, dropping to the NRFL Division 1 to play for Waiheke United during the winter football season. He signed for Waitakere United the following season, making only one appearance as backup to Nick Draper.

Later, having signed with North Shore United, Rodić won the NRFL Premier in 2019.

Rodić signed for Birkenhead United before the start of the 2022 New Zealand National League.

International career
Rodić has represented Croatia at U21 level, playing the full 90 minutes in a friendly against Togo in 2008.

References

External links
 
 
 Silvio Rodić at Sportnet.hr 

1987 births
Living people
Sportspeople from Osijek
Association football goalkeepers
Croatian footballers
Croatia under-21 international footballers
NK Slaven Belupo players
NK Koprivnica players
Zagłębie Lubin players
Górnik Łęczna players
Eastern Suburbs AFC players
Waitakere United players
North Shore United AFC players
Birkenhead United AFC players
Croatian Football League players
Ekstraklasa players
New Zealand Football Championship players
Croatian expatriate footballers
Expatriate footballers in Poland
Croatian expatriate sportspeople in Poland
Expatriate association footballers in New Zealand
Croatian expatriate sportspeople in New Zealand